Hallucinating Anxiety is the debut album by the Norwegian death metal band Cadaver. It was released in 1990 through Necrosis, a sub-label of Earache Records run by members of popular grindcore/death metal band Carcass. The LP and MC were the only versions to be released individually (and with all tracks), whereas the only CD version was a split with Carnage's only album, Dark Recollections, which omitted the track "Hypertrophyan" due to time constraints.

The track listing on all versions was incorrect, as it failed to list the track "Erosive Fester" (track 3), and mistakenly listed "Tuba" and "Ignominious Eczema" as separate tracks (1 and 2), when they are in fact joined together as track 1. This in turn means that what is listed as track 2 and 3 ("Ignominious Eczema" and "Corrosive Delirium", respectively) is also incorrect; tracks 2 and 3 are really "Corrosive Delirium" and "Erosive Fester".

Track listing
  "Tuba (Intro) / Ignominious Eczema"   – 5:09  
  "Corrosive Delirium"   – 2:56  
  "Erosive Fester"   – 2:42  
  "Hallucinating Anxiety"   – 3:44  
  "Cannibalistic Dissection"   – 2:46  
  "Hypertrophyan" (not on CD version)  – 3:18  
  "Petrifyed Faces"   – 2:46  
  "Innominate"   – 3:32  
  "Twisted Collapse"   – 2:19  
  "Abnormal Deformity"   – 3:18  
  "Maelstrom"   – 3:29  
  "Mental Abherrance"   – 2:32  
  "Bodily Trauma"   – 4:10

Cadaver (band) albums
1990 debut albums
Earache Records albums